Katie Vincent (born March 12, 1996) is a Canadian sprint canoeist. She competed at the 2020 Summer Olympics, in   Women's C-2 500 metres, winning a bronze medal.

Career
She participated at the 2017 Racice, 2018 ICF Canoe Sprint World Championships, 2019 Szeged.

She represented Canada at the 2020 Summer Olympics in the debut women's canoe events Women's C-1 200 metres.

References

External links

1996 births
Living people
Canadian female canoeists
ICF Canoe Sprint World Championships medalists in Canadian
Olympic canoeists of Canada
Medalists at the 2020 Summer Olympics
Olympic bronze medalists for Canada
Olympic medalists in canoeing
Canoeists at the 2020 Summer Olympics
Sportspeople from Mississauga
21st-century Canadian women